Vice-Admiral Sir John Charles Young Roxburgh,  (29 June 1919 – 13 April 2004) was a Royal Navy officer who became Flag Officer, Plymouth.

Naval career
Educated at Royal Naval College, Dartmouth, Roxborough joined the Royal Navy in 1933. He commanded the submarines HMS H43, HMS United and HMS Tapir during World War II. After the war he commanded the submarine HMS Turpin and the destroyer HMS Contest.

He was appointed Deputy Director of Plans (Navy) at the Ministry of Defence in 1964, Commanding Officer of the aircraft carrier HMS ''Eagle in 1965 and Flag Officer Sea Training in 1967. He went on to be Flag Officer, Plymouth in July 1969 and Flag Officer Submarines in September 1969 before retiring in 1972.

In retirement he was Chairman of the Grovebell Group, President of the Royal Naval Benevolent Trust, Chairman of The Freedom Association's management committee and a Surrey county councillor. He is buried at All Saints Church at Tilford in Surrey.

Family
In 1942 he married Philippa Hewlett at Honiton where they had one son and one daughter.

References

|-

|-

1919 births
2004 deaths
Royal Navy vice admirals
Knights Commander of the Order of the Bath
Commanders of the Order of the British Empire
Companions of the Distinguished Service Order
Recipients of the Distinguished Service Cross (United Kingdom)
Royal Navy officers of World War II
Councillors in Surrey